The Diligent Batman is a 1908 Russian short comedy film directed by N. Filippov.

Plot 
The film tells about an old general who takes care of his cook and brings to the kitchen sheets of sticky paper to fight the flies. The cook at the direction of the general everywhere spreads out these sheets. The general is replaced by the batman, who sits on a chair with paper and begins to fight with it.

Cast 
 V. Garlin as General
 N. Filippov as Batman

References

External links 
 
 «The Diligent Batman» on KM.ru
 «The Diligent Batman» on kino-teatr.ru

1908 films
1980s Russian-language films
Russian silent short films
Russian black-and-white films
1908 short films
Films of the Russian Empire
1908 comedy films
Russian comedy short films
Silent comedy films